Ryan Olowofela (born 17 April 1998) is an English rugby union player who plays centre or wing. Most recently, Ryan has been a part of the England national rugby sevens team. Between 2019 and 2021 he played for Northampton Saints in Premiership Rugby.

Career

Leicester Tigers
Ryan Olowofela was named as part of the Leicester Tigers team for the 2015 Premiership Rugby Sevens Series. Ryan wasn't announced in the Leicester Tigers squad for the 2017-18 season.

Rugby sevens
Ryan Olowofela was named as part of the England Rugby Sevens squad for the 2017 Rugby Europe Grand Prix Series. Ryan went on to participate in all four rounds of the series.

Northampton Saints
Northampton Saints announced the signing of Olowfela on 29 March 2019, with Olowofela to join that summer.

References

1998 births
Living people
Bedford Blues players
British identical twins
Coventry R.F.C. players
England international rugby sevens players
English rugby union players
Jersey Reds players
Northampton Saints players
Rugby union players from Kingston upon Hull
Twin sportspeople
English twins
People educated at Lincoln Minster School
English sportspeople of Nigerian descent
Black British sportspeople